is a Japanese animation studio based in Tokyo founded on July 3, 2013.

Works

Television series

References

External links

  
 

Animation studios in Tokyo
 
Japanese animation studios
Mass media companies established in 2013
Japanese companies established in 2013